Chakori Khurd is a village near about 7 km away from Lala Musa in Gujrat District, Punjab province, Pakistan. It is located in union council Kotla Qasim Khan.Khurd and Kalan Persian language word which means small and Big respectively when two villages have same name then it is distinguished as Kalan means Big and Khurd means Small with Village Name.

References

Populated places in Gujrat District